Christian Tschuggnall (born 1988 in Hall in Tirol) is an Austrian drummer, composer and author based in Berlin, Germany.

Biography 
Tschuggnall studied classical drums and percussion in Innsbruck, Austria. After moving to Berlin in 2009, he received his master's degree in jazz drums and composition at the Berlin University of the Arts where he studied with John Hollenbeck, Greg Cohen, David Friedman and Kurt Rosenwinkel.

His brother is the singer Michael Tschuggnall, who won the Austrian Castingshow Starmania in 2003 and was a participant in the Show Dancing Stars.

Career as a drummer 
Tschuggnall has collaborated with a variety of different artists and ensembles, including The Cinematic Orchestra, Ólafur Arnalds, Shackleton, Jocelyn B. Smith, Robyn Schulkowsky, Joey Baron, Frittenbude, Wolfgang Mitterer, Bluatschink and Wolfgang Fiedler.

In May 2012, he worked with Manu Delago on the DVD Manuscripts, which features the London Symphony Orchestra. During his studies in Innsbruck he won the nationwide Austrian music competition Prima La Musica four times.

From 2018 to 2019 he went on world tour as a drummer with Icelandic composer Ólafur Arnalds. Videos released by Ólafur Arnalds during that tour showed Tschuggnall playing drums and synthesizer.

Career as a composer

#klangberlins 
As a composer, Tschuggnall became internationally known through the branding-campaign #klangberlins of the Konzerthausorchester Berlin, which went viral on the Internet shortly after its release. It consists of 13 YouTube-videos, showing the whole range of the symphony orchestra imitating everyday sounds of the city Berlin, like people eating currywurst or riding the S-Bahn. The videos were watched over 3 million times. After local media reported on the success of the campaign, international media praised it for experimenting with classical instruments and trying to bring new audiences into classical concert halls.

For the campaign Tschuggnall composed a score together with the Australian composer Michael Edwards, with whom he also runs the music studio unheard in Berlin.

#klangberlins won several awards, including the Golden Award of Montreux and the Best Youtube Video of the year Award by the Art Directors Club Germany. For the score, Christian Tschuggnall and Michael Edwards got also nominated in the category Best Sound Design for the Music and Sound Awards 2017.

Music for film 
In 2019 one of his compositions was used in the final season of the TV show Game Of Thrones. Also, NASA used some of his pieces in video productions, some of which were also released on their YouTube channel.

Bands and projects 
As a bandleader, Tschuggnall released two albums with his group Snooze-On as well as with the experimental synthesizer and drum duo Sunrise Over A Dystopic Future City, a collaboration with the American keyboard player Liz Kosack.

Tschuggnall is a founding member of the Berlin Collective for Composed and Improvised Music (KIM).

In 2020 he published the book „Smart Practicing“ with co-author Markus Ehrlich.

Discography

As a bandleader 
 2013: Snooze-On – Snooze-On
 2016: Snooze-On - Drawn
 2016: SOADFC - Dystopia
2019: Rise and Fall - Christian Tschuggnall & Michael Edwards
2020: Nordic Scores - Christian Tschuggnall & Michael Edwards

As a sideman (selection) 
 2008: The Next Step – Bacchanal
 2012: Manuscripts – Manu Delago
 2013: Dinna Daussa – Bluatschink
 2014: Ophelia – Jonathan Kluth
 2015: My Way – Jocelyn B. Smith
 2016: Sun Dew
 2017: Tagtraum – Anna Marlene Bicking
2018: This Secret Cay - Sun Dew
2018: Quest - Out Of Nations
2019: re:visions - Ólafur Arnalds

Awards 
 2004: 1. prize nationwide Prima La Musica (Austria)
 2005: 1. prize nationwide Prima La Musica (Austria)
 2006: 1. prize nationwide Prima La Musica (Austria)
 2007: 1. prize nationwide Prima La Musica (Austria)
 2014: Nomination for the New German Jazz Prize (Snooze-On)
 2017: Finalist Golden Award of Montreux (#klangberlins)
 2017: ADC Peaks, Best YouTube Video of the year (#klangberlins)
 2017: Finalist Best Sounddesign Music and Sounds Awards (#klangberlins)
 2017: Winner Cannes Corporate Awards (#klangberlins)

External links 
 
 Christian Tschuggnall on Discogs

References 

1988 births
Living people
People from Hall in Tirol
Austrian composers
Austrian drummers
21st-century drummers